Stara Wieś  is a village in the administrative district of Gmina Końskowola, within Puławy County, Lublin Voivodeship, in eastern Poland.

As of 2008, the village has a population of 497.

References

Villages in Puławy County